Algoforma paralgoana is a species of moth of the family Tortricidae. It is found in South Africa.

The larvae feed on Allophylus species.

References

Endemic moths of South Africa
Moths described in 2005
Tortricini
Taxa named by Józef Razowski
Moths of Africa